The Bangsaen21 Half Marathon is an annual half marathon held in Bang Saen, Chonburi Province, Thailand. It is an IAAF Bronze Label race. It is currently the only half marathon in Thailand with the IAAF Bronze Label. The race is organized by MICE & Communication, a Bangkok-based event management company.

Past winners
Key:

References

External links 
Bangsaen21 official website

Marathons in Thailand